Who Do Ya (Love) is the fifth studio album by the funk and disco group KC and the Sunshine Band. The album was produced by Harry Wayne Casey and Richard Finch and was released in August 1978 on the TK label.

History
Who Do Ya (Love) was not as successful as the band's previous albums. Of the three singles released from the album, only one, a cover of the Four Tops' "It's the Same Old Song", managed to place in the top forty of the Billboard Hot 100.

Track listing

Personnel
Harry Wayne Casey – keyboards, lead vocals
Jerome Smith – guitar
Richard Finch – bass guitar; drums (tracks 5, 8)
Robert Johnson – drums (tracks 1-4, 6, 7)
Fermin Goytisolo – percussion
Ken Faulk – trumpet
Vinnie Tanno – trumpet
Mike Lewis – tenor saxophone
Whit Sidener – baritone saxophone
Beverly Champion – background vocals
Jeanette Williams – background vocals

References

External links
 Who Do Ya (Love) at Discogs

1978 albums
KC and the Sunshine Band albums
TK Records albums